The CAMS 50 was an amphibious bomber flying boat flown in the late 1920s. It used a monocoque fuselage, and the engines were arranged in a tandem configuration.

Specifications

References

Flying boats
Amphibious aircraft
CAMS aircraft
1920s French bomber aircraft
Aircraft first flown in 1926